Cheriton Halt is a disused railway station on the South Eastern Main Line which served the village of Cheriton on the outskirts of Folkestone in Kent, England. The station opened in 1908 and finally closed in 1947.

History 
The station, comprising two wooden platforms, was perched on the embankment just to the east of the underbridge on the B2063 Risborough Lane. Each platform was equipped with basic facilities: a ticket hut and waiting shelter, running-in boards and a row of gas lamps kept by the resident haltkeeper. The station was served solely by Elham Valley Railway trains and closed as a wartime economy measure during both wars, before closing definitively with the rest of the Elham Valley Railway in 1947.

References 

Disused railway stations in Kent
Former South Eastern Railway (UK) stations
Railway stations in Great Britain opened in 1908
Railway stations in Great Britain closed in 1915
Railway stations in Great Britain opened in 1920
Railway stations in Great Britain closed in 1941
Railway stations in Great Britain opened in 1946
Railway stations in Great Britain closed in 1947
1908 establishments in England
1947 disestablishments in England